Vidas Cruzadas (Crossed Lives) is a webnovela which premiered on Univision.com. After a legal dispute between Televisa and Univision, for the rights of Vidas Cruzadas, it finally premiered on Univision.com on August 12, 2009. The web cast of this new novel has brought together two major actors on the small screen: Kate del Castillo and Guy Ecker, who have been regarded as the most successful romantic couple. The 15-episode series consists of 5-to-7-minute episodes that are available exclusively to Univision.com users. Now different from the daily novela format, this only will "air" 3 times per week, which has some viewers confused judging from the comments left on the pages. It "airs" on Mondays, Wednesdays, and Fridays. Vidas Cruzadas is supported with a dedicated microsite featuring behind-the-scenes videos and photos and interactive features such as blogs, live chats, and forums. Other interactive features include a sweepstakes, allowing users to act out a scene and upload their videos for a chance to win a cameo in the show. The story has all the makings of a modern love dilemma: A successful career woman's biological clock is running out, and just as she decides to be a single mom through in-vitro, she meets the man of her dreams. Vidas Cruzadas was a project that took almost 3 years to come to reality.

Synopsis
Mariana is a writer in a local magazine for women. She is an enterprising and capable woman. Anyone who knows her would say she gets what she wants, but few know that what she most wants in life is motherhood. After ending a relationship with a singer and irresponsible dreamer, Mariana decides she can not keep waiting for her prince. Disappointed and convinced that she has no other option, follow the advice of her best friend and do something untraditional, something her parents would never understand.

Mariana decided to turn to artificial insemination and raise her son alone. After making this difficult decision, Mariana meets Daniel, a charming man, independent and single, who despite being a good player has not had a serious relationship since he ended with his girlfriend for a betrayal.

Daniel developed a certain apathy towards marriage, but all that changed when Mariana came into his life unexpectedly. Now Mariana must decide how and when to tell Daniel what she did and she is to discover a truth that will change her life and Daniel's forever.

Cast
 Kate del Castillo as Mariana
 Guy Ecker as Daniel
 Shaula Vega as Gloria
 Sofia Lama as Lucy
 Joaquín Garrido as José / Mariana's Father
 Alma Delfina as Lupe / Mariana's Mother
 Rodrigo de la Rosa as Raúl
 Alberto Zeni as Max
 Romina Peniche as Gina
 Alek Carrera as Gerardo
 Paulina Garcés as Andrea
 Christian Lanz as Jorge
 Marco Javier as Uncle Luis
 Art Bonilla as Mariachi – Doctor
 Blanca Wilterdinck as Executive
 Adriana Guzmán as Receptionist #1
 Nancy Victoria as Receptionist #2
 Fernanda Kelly as Receptionist #3
 Berenice Noriega as Nurse
 Felipe Cuevas as Chucho
 Martín Turman as Waiter #1
 Adrián García as Waiter #2
 Antonio de Carlo as Insurance Agent #1
 Alejandro Antonio as Insurance Agent #2
 Estefanía Iglesias as Woman #1
 Andre Howie as Valet
 Chrissie Kirk as Mom with a kid
 María Beck as Latina Woman
 Lizzet López as Woman that helps
 Ben Dixon as American Guy

Episodes

References

External links
 Vidas Cruzadas – Official Page
 Official Vidas Cruzadas "Mi Pagina" Page

Webnovelas